The powers of the police differ between the three legal systems of the United Kingdom.

Powers of the police in England and Wales
Powers of the police in Scotland
Powers of the police in Northern Ireland
 Police child protection powers in the United Kingdom